The International Center on Nonviolent Conflict is an independent, nonprofit educational foundation, founded by Jack DuVall and Peter Ackerman in 2002. It promotes the study and utilization of nonmilitary strategies by civilian-based movements to establish and defend human rights, social justice and democracy.

Aims
Based in Washington, DC, ICNC works with educational institutions and nongovernmental organizations in the United States and around the world to educate the global public and to influence policies and media coverage of the growing phenomenon of strategic nonviolent action.

History

ICNC was founded by Peter Ackerman and Jack DuVall in 2002. Jack DuVall serves as ICNC's president and founding director, while Peter Ackerman served as ICNC's Founding Chair. In 2015, Hardy Merriman transitioned into the role of ICNC president, then Senior Advisor then Secretary of the Board.

DuVall is a writer and former public television executive. He was the executive producer of a television series, A Force More Powerful, on the PBS network. He is also a co-author of the companion book of the same name (Palgrave/St. Martin's Press 2001).  The movie and book explore major 20th century nonviolent action campaigns and was nominated for and received numerous awards, including an Emmy nomination.

Peter Ackerman, who died in 2022, received a PhD from the Tufts University's Fletcher School for Law and Diplomacy in the 1970s, working under Gene Sharp, a widely respected academic and founder of nonviolent conflict as an academic field. Ackerman later become a venture capitalist and philanthrope. He was a highly-paid associate of Michael Milken at Drexel Burnham Lambert in the 1980s specializing in leveraged buyouts. During his academic career, Ackerman wrote a series of scholarly books on strategic nonviolent action. He also served on the board of Freedom House (including as chair between 2005 and 2009). He was a member of Council on Foreign Relations.[1]

In raising public awareness of the history and ideas of nonviolent conflict in both democratic and autocratic societies, ICNC has disseminated books, articles, broadcast media, video programming, computer games and other learning materials. Staff members and associated scholars have led seminars in North America, Latin America, Europe, Asia, Africa and the Middle East for journalists, activists, educators and NGO leaders on the history and dynamics of strategic nonviolent action.

ICNC involvement in seminars and workshops involving activists in human rights, pro-democracy and social justice campaigns overseas have led to charges from some governments of foreign intervention, though ICNC policy prohibits its presenters from giving specific advice regarding any particular struggle. Such workshops, according to ICNC policy, come only in response to specific requests from activist groups themselves and are not initiated by ICNC. ICNC also maintains a strictly apolitical posture, in that it works with groups challenging autocratic governments regardless of a given regime's ideological orientation or relations with the United States.

Many ICNC staff went on to work for democracy-promotion establishments such as the United States Institute of Peace, a US nonpartisan, independent institute, founded by Congress and dedicated to a world without violent conflict.

ICNC has cooperated with other independent non-profit groups concerned with strategic nonviolent action, including the Albert Einstein Institution, Nonviolence International, and the Serbian-based Centre for Applied Nonviolent Action and Strategies (CANVAS). For several years, ICNC was funded exclusively through a private family endowment. However, in 2021, ICNC began fundraising from outside funders in view of a leadership transition. ICNC maintains a strict policy of not collaborating with any government or government-funded entities.

Hardy Merriman, who is Secretary of the ICNC Board, worked for the Albert Einstein Institution from 2002 to 2005. Peter Ackerman funded the Albert Einstein Institution from its founding in 1983 until 2002.

Online Resource Library 
With more than 1,000 book chapters, articles, and other written and multimedia resources on civil resistance and nonviolent movements, ICNC's Resource Library is the largest online database of free resources on the topic in the world. However, there are many other online outlets offering access to a variety of resources on this topic and related topics. The library includes translations of many of these resources in more than 70 languages.

ICNC Press 
In 2015, ICNC launched its own press called ICNC Press and has since published over 40 titles in English, Spanish, Tibetan, French, Polish, Portuguese and many other languages. The titles include academic monographs, resources for practitioners, workbooks/guides, policy-relevant reports, as well as memoires, all focusing on different nonviolent movements or dynamics of nonviolent conflict. Since 2021, ICNC Press titles have been available in the form of e-books and have been cited as references in numerous academic and policy publications.

Minds of the Movement Blog 
ICNC launched in June 2017 its multi-author Minds of the Movement blog. As of June 2022, the blog counted more than 230 published posts, all focusing on the dynamics of civil resistance and nonviolent movements and campaigns worldwide, from history to the present. Amber French, blog managing editor, developed and launched the blog along with ICNC President Hardy Merriman and the input of numerous stakeholders, notably members of the ICNC Academic Board but also prominent nonviolent activists. 

Blog content includes movement commentary, interviews, research syntheses, ideas and trends features, and book reviews. Bloggers (more than 100 authors as of June 2022) include academics, students, movement organizers and activists, journalists and diverse members of civil society from dozens of countries. Minds of the Movement blog posts have been translated into French, Thai, Ukrainian, Spanish, and other languages and have been cited in numerous bibliographies of books and policy reports. Minds of the Movement joins a small number of original online news outlets like Waging Nonviolence whose sole focus is civil resistance.

ICNC online courses 
Since 2012, ICNC has offered numerous competitive-selection online courses for those interested in and working in or on civil resistance movements. ICNC offers different kinds of courses: 1) Moderated courses, which involve interactive discussion with peers and experts in the field; 2) Unmoderated, participant-run courses, which involve interactive discussions with peers moving through an expertly developed curriculum; 3) Individualized, self-paced courses for general and professional audiences with varying levels of background knowledge; and 4) the ICNC Academic Online Curriculum (AOC) on Civil Resistance, which is an extensive and regularly updated set of resources on civil resistance, organized into clearly structured topics and case studies, in order to facilitate easy learning and curriculum development.

Criticism of ICNC's educational work 
Due to the political nature of many of the problems facing ordinary people worldwide—authoritarianism, social injustices, human rights violations, disregard for the climate, and more—ICNC has received criticism for its work to educate activists in nonviolent civil resistance. Criticism usually generates with traditional powerholders who are targets of mass nonviolent movements against authoritarianism, as well as members of their entrenched regime. One example is pro-Chavez American-Venezuelan lawyer Eva Golinger who alleged that during 2005 and 2006, ICNC trained Venezuelan youths to try to reverse the government of Hugo Chávez, through "[impeding] the electoral process and [creating] a scenario of fraud," claiming that ICNC did this together with USAID and NED as part of a systemic plan of implementing United States foreign policy aims in democratic countries. ICNC denies it ever engaged in such trainings, which are a violation of its charter. Jack Duvall has claimed that ICNC in 2007 supported the travel of two nonviolent activists to the World Social Forum in Caracas, at which they met with Chavez supporters to discuss methods of resisting any possible coup attempt.

Response to criticism
In response to criticism from regime supporters and other adversaries of nonviolent movements for rights, justice and freedom, ICNC reinforced its operating guidelines in 2015 to include the following:

 ICNC’s programs aim to reach diverse individuals and groups who seek understanding about civil resistance movements and are committed to establishing and defending human rights, democratic self-rule and justice worldwide.
 Our work with activists, organizers, and other practitioners is demand driven. In response to contacts and requests initiated by groups or people seeking to end oppression or injustice through nonviolent methods, ICNC can help in enabling seminars, workshops, and educational events to be held; and/or supporting general educational projects related to civil resistance.
 ICNC is an educational organization that aims to develop and share knowledge and information. In our work, we do not provide political or strategic advice to those contemplating or engaged in civil resistance; we do not assist activists in conducting civil resistance actions; and we do not furnish funds to subsidize a movement’s operations.
 ICNC can support research and general educational projects by other nongovernmental organizations and individuals, if they are directly related to expanding understanding of the principles and skills involved in civil resistance.
 ICNC accepts no grants, contracts or funding of any kind from any government or government-related organization, or from any corporation. It is funded primarily by the family philanthropy of the founding chair.
 ICNC observes the right to privacy of those who contact it, for the protection of people who may face repression or intimidation for exercising their rights. Accordingly, ICNC abides by requests for confidentiality from individuals who communicate with it.

External links
 International Center on Nonviolent Conflict website

References

Nonviolence
Non-profit organizations based in Washington, D.C.